Renegade is the third studio album by Swedish heavy metal band HammerFall. It was released on 9 October 2000 on the Nuclear Blast label and is the first album to feature drummer Anders Johansson. Former drummer of HammerFall and founder of heavy metal band In Flames Jesper Strömblad still wrote some of the album's songs, even after parting ways with the band in 1997. The album debuted on the Swedish charts at number one and was eventually awarded a gold certification.

Track listing

Digipak and Brazilian edition bonus tracks

The Russian version has the following bonus tracks: "Run with the Devil" (Heavy Load cover) and "Head Over Heels" (Accept cover).

Music videos
 The band created a music video for "Always Will Be".
The track "Renegade" was also made into a music video.

Chart positions

Credits
Joacim Cans – lead vocals
Oscar Dronjak – guitars, backing vocals
Stefan Elmgren – guitars, backing vocals
Magnus Rosén – bass
Anders Johansson – drums
Jamie Simmons, Paul Simmons, John Alexander – additional backing vocals on "Destined for Glory"

Recording information
Recorded at WireWorld Studios in Nashville, Tennessee, April–June 2000.
Produced, recorded, engineered and mixed by Michael Wagener.
Mastered by Eric Conn.
Harley-Davidson sound on "Renegade" provided by Promise Breakers Motorcycle Club Nashville.

Art information
 Following original ideas by Joacim Cans and Oscar Dronjak.
 Photos by Michael Johansson.

References

External links
 Official HammerFall website
 Album information
 Lyrics at Darklyrics
 Encyclopaedia Metallum

2000 albums
HammerFall albums
Albums produced by Michael Wagener
Nuclear Blast albums